Eugene Stanley Bright (born April 18, 1985) is a former American football tight end. He was signed by the Philadelphia Eagles as a street free agent in 2009. He played college football at Purdue. He is the older brother of Callahan Bright.

Professional career

Philadelphia Eagles
After being undrafted in the 2008 NFL Draft, Bright signed with the Philadelphia Eagles on April 23, 2009. He was waived on September 4, 2009.

Pittsburgh Steelers
Bright was signed to the Pittsburgh Steelers practice squad on November 2, 2009. He was signed to the active roster on January 6, 2010. After being released on September 4, 2010, he was again signed to the practice squad on September 6, 2010.

External links
Philadelphia Eagles bio
Purdue Boilermakers bio

1985 births
Living people
Players of American football from Pennsylvania
American football defensive ends
American football tight ends
Purdue Boilermakers football players
Philadelphia Eagles players
Pittsburgh Steelers players
Harriton High School alumni